Krav Maga is an Israeli martial art. Developed for the Israel Defense Forces (IDF), it is derived from a combination of techniques used in aikido, judo, karate, boxing, and wrestling. It is known for its focus on real-world situations and its extreme efficiency. Hungarian-born Israeli martial artist Imi Lichtenfeld, who made use of his training as a boxer and wrestler to defend Jews in Bratislava against fascist groups in the mid-to-late 1930s, developed Krav Maga through his experiences in street fighting. After his immigration to Mandatory Palestine in the late 1940s, he began to provide lessons on combat training to Jewish paramilitary groups that would later form the IDF during the Israeli War of Independence.

From the outset, the original concept of Krav Maga was to take the most effective and practical techniques of other fighting styles (originally European boxing, wrestling, and street fighting) and make them rapidly teachable to conscripted soldiers. It has a philosophy emphasizing aggression and simultaneous defensive and offensive maneuvers, and has been used by Israeli special forces and regular infantry units alike. Closely related variations have been developed and adopted by Israeli law enforcement and intelligence organizations, and there are also several organizations teaching variations of Krav Maga internationally. Additionally, there are two forms of Krav Maga, with one type adapted for Israeli security forces and the other type adapted for civilian use.

Etymology
The term krav maga in Hebrew is literally translated as 'contact combat' – the three letter root of the first word is k-r-v, and the noun derived from this root means either "combat" or "battle"; whereas the second word is a participle form derived from the verb root n-g-'a, that literally means either "contact" or "touch".

Basic principles

Like most martial arts, Krav Maga encourages students to avoid physical confrontation. If this is impossible or unsafe, it promotes finishing a fight as quickly and aggressively as possible. Attacks are aimed at the most vulnerable parts of the body, and training is not limited to techniques that avoid severe injury; some even permanently injure or cause death to the opponent.

Students learn to defend against all variety of attacks and are taught to counter in the quickest and most efficient way.

Ideas in Krav Maga include:
 Simultaneous defense and attack.
 Developing physical aggression (not to be confused with emotional aggression or anger), with the view that physical aggression is the most important component in a fight.
 Continuing to strike the opponent until they are completely incapacitated.
 Attacking pre-emptively or counterattacking as soon as possible.
 Using any objects at hand that could be used to hit an opponent.
 Targeting attacks to the body's most vulnerable points, such as: the eyes, neck or throat, face, solar plexus, groin, ribs, knee, foot, fingers, liver, etc.
 Using simple and easily repeatable strikes.
 Maintaining awareness of surroundings while dealing with the threat in order to look for escape routes, further attackers, or objects that could be used to strike an opponent.
 Developing muscle memory for quick reaction in fight.
 Recognizing the importance of and expanding on instinctive response under stress.

Training can also cover the study and development of situational awareness to develop an understanding of one's surroundings, learning to understand the psychology of a street confrontation, and identifying potential threats before an attack occurs. It may also cover physical and verbal methods to avoid violence whenever possible. It also teaches mental toughness, using controlled scenarios to strengthen mental fortitude in order for students to control the impulse and not do something rash, but instead attack only when necessary and as a last resort.

Techniques

Some of the key focuses of techniques in Krav Maga are—as described above—effectiveness and instinctive response under stress. To that end, Krav Maga is an eclectic system that has not sought to replace existing effective techniques, taking what is useful from available systems, for example:
 Strikes – as per karate, and boxing,
 Take-downs and throws – per judo, aikido and wrestling
 Ground work – per judo and wrestling
 Escapes from chokes and holds – per judo, aikido, wrestling
 Empty-hand weapon defenses – per aikido

History
Imre "Imi" Lichtenfeld (also known as Imi S'de-Or) was born in 1910 in Budapest, Austro-Hungary to a Jewish family and grew up in Bratislava (Slovakia). Lichtenfeld became active in a wide range of sports, including gymnastics, wrestling, and boxing. In 1928, Lichtenfeld won the Slovak Youth Wrestling Championship, and in 1929 the adult championship (light and middle weight divisions). That same year, he also won the national boxing championship and an international gymnastics championship. During the ensuing decade, Lichtenfeld's athletic activities focused mainly on wrestling, both as a contestant and a trainer.

In the mid-1930s, anti-Semitic riots began to threaten the Jews of Bratislava, Czechoslovakia. Lichtenfeld became the leader of a group of Jewish boxers and wrestlers who took to the streets to defend Jewish neighborhoods against the growing numbers of anti-Semitic Nazis. Lichtenfeld quickly discovered, however, that actual fighting was very different from competition fighting, and although boxing and wrestling were good sports, they were not always practical for the aggressive and brutal nature of street combat. It was then that he started to re-evaluate his ideas about fighting and started developing the skills and techniques that would eventually become Krav Maga. Having become a thorn in the side of the equally anti-Semitic local authorities, in 1940 Lichtenfeld left his home with his family and friends on the last refugee ship to escape Europe.

After making his way to Mandatory Palestine, Lichtenfeld joined the Haganah paramilitary organization. In 1944 Lichtenfeld began training fighters in his areas of expertise: physical fitness, swimming, wrestling, use of the knife, and defense against knife attacks. During this period, Lichtenfeld trained several elite units of the Haganah, including the Palmach (striking force of the Haganah and forerunner of the special units of the Israel Defense Forces) and the Palyam, as well as groups of police officers.

In 1948, when the State of Israel was founded and the IDF was formed, Lichtenfeld became Chief Instructor for Physical Fitness and Krav Maga at the IDF School of Combat Fitness. He served in the IDF for about 20 years, during which time he developed and refined his unique method for self-defense and hand-to-hand combat. Self-defense was not a new concept, since nearly all martial arts had developed some form of defensive techniques in their quest for tournament or sport dominance.  However, self-defense was based strictly upon the scientific and dynamic principles of the human body. In 1965 judo training was added as part of the Krav Maga training. Until 1968 there were no grades in Krav Maga. Then a trainee's grades were determined largely by his knowledge in judo.

In 1968, Eli Avikzar, Lichtenfeld's principal student and first black belt, began learning aikido. In 1971 Eli left for France, where he received a black belt in aikido. Upon his return, Avikzar started working as an instructor alongside Imi to integrate more traditional martial arts into krav maga.  Then in 1974 Imre retired and gave Eli Avikzar control over the Krav Maga training center in Netanya. Shortly after, in 1976, Avikzar joined the permanent force of IDF, as head of the Krav Maga section. The role of Krav Maga in the army advanced greatly after Eli's appointment. More courses were given and every P.E. instructor was obliged to learn Krav Maga. Avikzar continued to develop Krav Maga within the IDF until his retirement in 1987. Up to this date, Eli had trained 80,000 male soldiers and 12,000 female soldiers.

Further pursuing excellence as a student of martial arts, Eli went to Germany in 1977 and received a black belt in aikido from the European Federation.<ref name="wincol.ac.il" In 1978 the Krav Maga association was established, and in 1989, as an active member of the judo association, Eli Avikzar helped to establish the professional and rank committees by founding the Israeli Krav Maga Association (IKMA or KAMI). Eli retired as the Chief Krav Maga instructor in 1987 and Boaz Aviram became the third person to hold the position, being the last head instructor to have studied directly with both Lichtenfeld and Avikzar.

Israeli Defense Forces
The IDF offers a five-week Krav Maga instructor course. It has held an annual Krav Maga competition since May 2013.

Civilian use

Upon Imi Lichtenfeld's retirement from the IDF, he decided to open a school and teach Krav Maga to civilians.
The first Krav Maga course took place at the Wingate Institute, Netanya, Israel, in 1971, under his direct supervision.

Grading system
Most of the Krav Maga organizations in Israel use Imi Lichtenfeld's colored belt grading system which is based upon the Judo ranking system. It starts with white belt, and then yellow, orange, green, blue, brown and black belts. Black belt students can move up the ranks from 1st to 9th Dan. The time and requirements for advancing have some differences between the organizations.

Other organizations that teach Krav Maga in and outside of Israel use similar grading systems.

A patch system was developed by Eyal Yanilov in the late 1980s. The grades are divided into three main categories; Practitioner, Graduate and Expert. Each of the categories, which are often abbreviated to their initials, has five ranks. Grades P1 through to P5 are the student levels and make up the majority of the Krav Maga community. After P5 are G1-G5, and in order to achieve Graduate level the student has to demonstrate a proficiency in all of the P level techniques before advancing.

Although there are some subtle differences, the various organizations teach the same core techniques and principles. Some other organizations have less formal grading ranks without belts or patches but do have levels by which students can monitor their progress.

Sparring
In some organizations sparring is slow and light until the student reaches G2 level. This takes approximately four to six years because rising one level in the Practitioner and Graduate categories takes at minimum half a year of consistent training. It is, however, more common to observe regular trainees grading only once a year from P3 and up.

Once in G2, students also do simulated "real" fighting with protective gear.

In media
 Christian Bale used Krav Maga when playing Batman on The Dark Knight and The Dark Knight Rises.

See also
 Close-quarters combat
 Jieitaikakutojutsu
 Defendu
 Combatives

References

External links
 

 
Hybrid martial arts
Israeli martial arts
Articles containing video clips